Miankuh Rural District is in Miankuh District of Ardal County, Chaharmahal and Bakhtiari province, Iran. At the census of 2006, its population was 10,622 in 2,161 households; there were 10,709 inhabitants in 2,587 households at the following census of 2011; and in the most recent census of 2016, the population of the rural district was 6,973 in 1,917 households. The largest of its 31 villages was Refen, with 991 people.

References 

Ardal County

Rural Districts of Chaharmahal and Bakhtiari Province

Populated places in Chaharmahal and Bakhtiari Province

Populated places in Ardal County